Lindy Ave (born 9 July 1998) is a German Paralympic athlete who competes in sprinting and long jump in international level events.

References

External links
 
 

1998 births
Living people
German female sprinters
German female long jumpers
Paralympic athletes of Germany
Athletes (track and field) at the 2016 Summer Paralympics
Athletes (track and field) at the 2020 Summer Paralympics
Medalists at the World Para Athletics Championships
Medalists at the World Para Athletics European Championships
Sportspeople from Mecklenburg-Western Pomerania
People from Greifswald
21st-century German women